Joseph Louis Robert Edgar Fillion (July 12, 1920 – August 13, 2015) was a Canadian professional ice hockey player who played seven seasons for the Montreal Canadiens of the National Hockey League (NHL) between 1943 and 1950. He was a member of two Stanley Cup-winning teams during his career with Montreal; in 1944 and 1946. He also spent time with the Buffalo Bisons of the AHL and the Sherbrooke Saints of the Quebec Senior Hockey League (QSHL). He died on August 13, 2015. At the time of his death, Fillion was the last surviving member of the Canadiens' 1944 Stanley Cup team.

Fillion hockey playing family
Born in Thetford Mines, Quebec, Fillion is a member of Thetford Mines' and one of Quebec's most famous hockey family, being one of seven hockey playing siblings. Right winger Marcel also reached the National Hockey League, playing one game for the Boston Bruins in 1944–1945 and playing in the Eastern Hockey League, the American Hockey League and the Quebec Senior Hockey League from 1944 to 1952. Right winger Dennis played in the United States Hockey League, the Pacific Coast Hockey League, the American Hockey League, the Maritime Major Hockey League, the Quebec Senior Hockey League and the Atlantic Coast Senior League from 1948 to 1956. Defenceman Georges was invited to the Montreal Canadiens training camp at the same time as Bob but decided to return home to Thetford Mines because he did not speak English very well. He played in the Quebec Senior Hockey League. Nelson, Fernand and Jean-Marie Fillion also played in the Quebec Senior Hockey League and various Senior Hockey leagues throughout the years. All seven Fillion brothers played on the same team, the Thetford Chappies of the Ligue Intermédiaire de Hockey du Québec during the 1940s. This was where Bob and Georges were spotted by a Canadiens scout.

Post Hockey

Fillion returned to Thetford Mines to work as a manager at the mines, later moving to Saint-Jean-sur-Richelieu and died in Longueuil, Quebec.

Career statistics

Regular season and playoffs

References

External links
 

1920 births
2015 deaths
Buffalo Bisons (AHL) players
Canadian ice hockey left wingers
Ice hockey people from Quebec
Montreal Canadiens players
Shawinigan-Falls Cataracts (QSHL) players
Sherbrooke Saints players
Sportspeople from Thetford Mines
Stanley Cup champions